Lectionary 171, designated by siglum ℓ 171 (in the Gregory-Aland numbering) is a Greek manuscript of the New Testament, on parchment leaves. Paleographically it has been assigned to the 9th century. 
Formerly it was labelled as Lectionary 70a. Scrivener by 72a.

Description 

The codex contains Lessons from the Acts and Epistles lectionary (Apostolarion) (Romans 13:11 and 2 Corinthians 11:21-23),
on only 1 parchment leaf (21.5 cm by 14.6 cm). The text is written in Greek uncial letters, in two columns per page, 25 lines per page. It is a palimpsest. It contains music notes.

History 

The manuscript was examined by Constantin von Tischendorf. 

The manuscript is not cited in the critical editions of the Greek New Testament (UBS3).

Currently the codex is located in the Russian National Library (Gr. 38, fol. 8) at Saint Petersburg.

See also 

 List of New Testament lectionaries
 Biblical manuscript
 Textual criticism

Notes and references

Bibliography 

 Constantin von Tischendorf, Anecdota sacra inedita, 8, 11, XIII

Greek New Testament lectionaries
9th-century biblical manuscripts
Palimpsests